Zaraqoli-ye Bala (also Romanized as Zarāqolī-ye Bālā; also known as Zarāqolī-ye ‘Olyā) is a village in Howmeh-ye Gharbi Rural District, in the Central District of Ramhormoz County, Khuzestan Province, Iran. At the 2006 census, its population was 242, in 45 families.

References 

Populated places in Ramhormoz County